The year 1825 in architecture involved some significant architectural events and new buildings.

Events
 The front and rear porticoes of The White House are added to the building.

Buildings and structures

Buildings completed

 Moscow Manege, Moscow, Russia, designed by Agustín de Betancourt.
 Tuskulėnai Manor in Vilnius by Karol Podczaszyński.
 Palais Brongniart, the Paris Bourse, completed posthumously to the designs of Alexandre-Théodore Brongniart.
 City Hall in Karlsruhe (Baden), designed by Friedrich Weinbrenner.
 St Peter's Church, Walworth, London, designed by John Soane.

Births
 July 14 – Adolf Cluss, German-born architect in Washington, D.C. (died 1905)
 August 7 – Jacob Wrey Mould, New York architect, illustrator, linguist and musician (died 1886)
 October 22 – Friedrich von Schmidt, Austrian architect based in Vienna (died 1891)
 November 6 – Charles Garnier, French architect (died 1898)
 date unknown
 James Brooks, English Gothic Revival architect (died 1901)
 William White, English Gothic Revival architect (died 1900)

Deaths
 June 14 – Pierre Charles L'Enfant, French-born US architect and civil engineer (born 1754)

References

Architecture
Years in architecture
19th-century architecture